The Battle of Portland Harbor was an incident during the American Civil War, in June 1863, in the waters off Portland, Maine. Two civilian ships engaged two vessels under Confederate States Navy employment.

Background
Around June 24, a Confederate raider named the Tacony, commanded by Lieutenant Charles Read, CSN, was being pursued by the Union Navy. To thwart their pursuers, at about 2 AM on June 25, the Confederates captured the Archer, a Maine fishing schooner out of Southport. After transferring their supplies and cargo onto Archer, the Confederates set fire to Tacony, hoping the Union Navy would believe the ship was destroyed.

On June 26, a Confederate raiding party entered the harbor at Portland late in the evening, sailing past Portland Head Light. The rebels disguised themselves as fishermen; they planned to try to destroy the area's commercial shipping capability, and then to escape out of the harbor.

Battle
When the raiders left the port area on June 27, they proceeded to the federal wharf. Having the advantage of surprise, the crew seized a cutter belonging to the Revenue Service, the USRC Caleb Cushing (named for a Massachusetts congressman, United States Attorney General and Minister to Spain). Their original intent was to seize the side wheel steamer Chesapeake, but its boilers were cold. As they would lose too much time in getting the steam up, they took Cushing. They escaped and sailed out to sea.

News spread of the Confederate actions and the Army garrison at Fort Preble in nearby South Portland was alerted to the rebel intrusion. The Confederates had been observed by several persons while taking over the cutter, and public fury was aroused. Thirty soldiers from Fort Preble were assigned to pursue the raiders; they took a six-pound field piece and a 12-pound howitzer. Accompanied by about 100 civilian volunteers, the soldiers commandeered the steamer Forest City, a side-wheel excursion ship, and the Chesapeake, whose steam was finally up.  All of the civilians on board were issued muskets to defend against the Confederates.

Forest City, the faster ship, was the first to catch up to Cushing and Archer. Cushing opened fire on Forest City when it had come within the  range. The captain of Forest City was afraid to pursue any further. Cushing, being a revenue cutter, had two secret compartments hidden in the captain's stateroom.  Confederate Lieutenant Read had not discovered the cache of powder and ammunition stored there. If he had, the outcome could have been very different.

Chesapeake, which had left port sometime after Forest City with Portland's Mayor Jacob McLellan in command, finally caught up and continued on toward Cushing. The wind was beginning to blow against the Confederate sailors and the steamers soon caught sight of Cushing. Read, the Confederate lieutenant, ordered Cushing torched; its munitions exploded after the ship was abandoned by her twenty-four crewmen, who escaped in lifeboats. They surrendered to Mayor McLellan and were held as prisoners of war at Fort Preble. Archer was also soon captured, and all the rebels were returned to Portland.

Aftermath
It was discovered that the Confederates were in possession of over $100,000 in bonds. These were to be paid after a treaty for peace was ratified between the North and the South.

Public anger against the Southerners was high, and the city requested additional troops to safeguard the prisoners. When they were to be transported to Boston in July, the men had to be spirited out of Portland during the night to prevent a riot from breaking out. They were removed to Boston Harbor, and held at Fort Warren.

Footnotes

References

  
Maine Bureau of Corporations, Elections, and Commissions
Harper's Weekly, 11 July 1863
Confederate Navy Research Center, Mobile, Alabama
The New York Times, 28 June 1863.
 

Portland Harbor
Portland Harbor
Portland Harbor
Portland
Portland Harbor
19th century in Portland, Maine
June 1863 events